Vladimir Aleksandrovich Maminov (born 4 September 1974) is a Russian-born football manager and a former player who represented Uzbekistan internationally.

Career
He played all his career for Russian Premier League club FC Lokomotiv Moscow as a central midfielder.

International
Born in Moscow, Maminov was one of several foreign-born players to represent the Uzbekistan national football team in 2002 FIFA World Cup qualifying. He scored on his debut, a 7–0 victory against Taiwan on 23 April 2001.

Maminov received 12 caps and scored three goals for the national team between 2001 and 2005.

Club career stats
Last update: 29 November 2008

Honours
Team
Russian Premier League :
Winner: 2 (2002, 2004)
Runner-up: 4 (1995, 1999, 2000, 2001)
3rd position: 4 (1994, 1998, 2005, 2006)
Russian Cup
Winner: 5 (1995/96, 1996/97, 1999/00, 2000/01, 2006/07)
Runner-up: 1 (1997/98)
Russian Super Cup
Winner: 2 (2003, 2005)
Runner-up: 1 (2008)
CIS Cup :
Winner: 1 (2005)

Individual
33 Best Russian Player :
1st: 2004
2nd: 2002, 2003

Coaching career

Lokomotiv
Maminov was named as caretaker head coach for FC Lokomotiv Moscow on 28 April 2009, he replaced Rashid Rakhimov. Maminov started his coaching career with a victory over Spartak Nalchik. He became assistant to Yuri Semin when Semin was appointed the new manager. After Yuri Krasnozhan was fired from manager position in June 2011, Maminov was appointed the caretaker once more. This time he managed the team for about 3 weeks before being replaced by José Couceiro.

Rubin
On 10 January 2014, Maminov was appointed assistant manager of FC Rubin Kazan.

Khimki
On 19 June 2014, Maminov was appointed head coach of FC Khimki.

See also
 One-club man

References

External links

1974 births
Living people
Footballers from Moscow
Uzbekistani people of Russian descent
Russian footballers
Uzbekistani footballers
Uzbekistan international footballers
FC Lokomotiv Moscow players
Russian Premier League players
Russian football managers
FC Lokomotiv Moscow managers
FC Khimki managers
Russian Premier League managers
Association football midfielders
FC Tyumen managers
FC Aktobe managers